The L8-D gas field is a natural gas field located in the North Sea. It was discovered in 2004 and developed by Cirrus Energy. It began production in 2007 and produces natural gas and condensates. The total proven reserves of the L8-D gas field are around 323 billion cubic feet (9.1×109m³), and production is centered on 8 million cubic feet/day (3.1×105m³).

References

 

Natural gas fields in the Netherlands